The 2016–17 Biathlon World Cup – Individual Women started on Wednesday 30 November 2016 in Östersund and finished on Wednesday 15 February 2017 at the World Championships in Hochfilzen. The defending titlist was Dorothea Wierer of Italy.

The small crystal globe winner for the category was Laura Dahlmeier of Germany.

Competition format
The  individual race is the oldest biathlon event; the distance is skied over five laps. The biathlete shoots four times at any shooting lane, in the order of prone, standing, prone, standing, totalling 20 targets. For each missed target a fixed penalty time, usually one minute, is added to the skiing time of the biathlete. Competitors' starts are staggered, normally by 30 seconds.

2015–16 Top 3 standings

Medal winners

Standings

References

Individual Women